The Homeland Security Subcommittee on Transportation and Maritime Security is a subcommittee within the House Homeland Security Committee. It was the Subcommittee on Transportation Security and Infrastructure Protection until 2011, when infrastructure jurisdiction was transferred to the Subcommittee on Cybersecurity, Infrastructure Protection, and Security 
Technologies.

Members, 117th Congress

Historical membership rosters

115th Congress

116th Congress

External links
 Official Site

Homeland Transportation